Eom Ji-sung (born 9 May 2002) is a South Korean footballer currently playing as a forward for Gwangju.

Career statistics

Club

Notes

International goals
Scores and results list South Korea's goal tally first, score column indicates score after each Eom goal.

Honours

Club 
Gwangju FC:
 K League 2 : 2022

Individual
 K League Young Player of the Year (K League 2): 2022
K League 2 Best XI: 2022

References

2002 births
Living people
South Korean footballers
South Korea youth international footballers
Association football forwards
K League 1 players
Gwangju FC players